Applied science is the use of the scientific method and knowledge obtained via conclusions from the method to attain practical goals. It includes a broad range of disciplines such as engineering and medicine. Applied science is often contrasted with basic science, which is focused on advancing scientific theories and laws that explain and predict natural or other phenomena.

Applied science can also apply formal science, such as statistics and probability theory, as in epidemiology. Genetic epidemiology is an applied science applying both biological and statistical methods. Applied science can also apply social science, such as application of psychology in applied psychology, criminology and law.

Applied research
Applied research is the practical application of science. It accesses and uses accumulated theories, knowledge, methods, and techniques, for a specific state-, business-, or client-driven purpose. In contrast to engineering, applied research does not include analyses or optimization of business, economics, and costs. Applied research can be better understood in any area when contrasting it with, basic, or pure, research. Basic geography research strives to create new theories and methods that aid in the explanation of the processes that shape the spatial structure of physical or human environments. Rather, applied research utilizes the already existing geographical theories and methods to comprehend and address particular empirical issues.

Applied research usually has specific commercial objectives related to products, procedures, or services. The comparison of pure research and applied research provides a basic framework and direction for businesses to follow.

Applied research deals with solving practical problems and generally employs empirical methodologies. Because applied research resides in the messy real world, strict research protocols may need to be relaxed. For example, it may be impossible to use a random sample. Thus, transparency in the methodology is crucial. Implications for interpretation of results brought about by relaxing an otherwise strict canon of methodology should also be considered.

Moreover, this type of research method applies natural sciences to human conditions:

 Action Research: aids firms in identifying workable solutions to issues influencing them.
 Evaluation Research: researchers examine available data to assist clients in making wise judgements.
 Industrial Research: create new goods/services that will satisfy the demands of a target market. (Industrial development would be scaling up production of the new goods/services for mass consumption to satisfy the economic demand of the customers while maximizing the ratio of the good/service output rate to resource input rate, the ratio of good/service revenue to material & energy costs, and the good/service quality. Industrial development would be considered engineering. Industrial development would fall outside the scope of applied research.)

Since applied research has a provisional close-to-the-problem and close-to-the-data orientation, it may also use a more provisional conceptual framework such as working hypotheses or pillar questions. The OECD's Frascati Manual describes applied research as one of the three forms of research, along with basic research & experimental development.

Due to its practical focus, applied research information will be found in the literature associated with individual disciplines.

Branches

Applied science works as a system that branches into other fields of work that go more in depth of the system. Applied research is a method of problem solving and also practical in areas of science such as its presence in applied psychology. Applied psychology uses human behavior to grab information to be able locate a main focus in an area that can contribute to finding a resolution. More specific, this study is applied in the area of criminal psychology. With the knowledge obtained of applied research, studies are conducted on criminals alongside their behavior to apprehend them. Moreover, the research extends to criminal investigations. Under this category, research methods demonstrate an understanding of the scientific method and social research designs used in criminological research. These reach more branches along the procedure towards the investigations, alongside laws, policy, and criminological theory.

Engineering fields include thermodynamics, heat transfer, fluid mechanics, statics, dynamics, mechanics of materials, kinematics, electromagnetism, materials science, earth sciences, engineering physics. These fields are also within the scope of basic science.

Medical sciences, for instance medical microbiology, pharmaceutical research and clinical virology, are applied sciences that apply biology and chemistry toward medicine. Pharmaceutical development would fall within the scope of engineering.

In education
In Canada, the Netherlands and other places the Bachelor of Applied Science (BASc) is sometimes equivalent to the Bachelor of Engineering, and is classified as a professional degree. This is based on the age of the school where applied science used to include boiler making, surveying and engineering. There are also Bachelor of Applied Science degrees in Child Studies. The BASc tends to focus more on the application of the engineering sciences. In Australia and New Zealand, this degree is awarded in various fields of study and is considered a highly specialized professional degree.

In the United Kingdom's educational system, Applied Science refers to a suite of "vocational" science qualifications that run alongside "traditional" General Certificate of Secondary Education or A-Level Sciences. Applied Science courses generally contain more coursework (also known as portfolio or internally assessed work) compared to their traditional counterparts. These are an evolution of the GNVQ qualifications that were offered up to 2005. These courses regularly come under scrutiny and are due for review following the Wolf Report 2011; however, their merits are argued elsewhere.

In the United States, The College of William & Mary offers an undergraduate minor as well as Master of Science and Doctor of Philosophy degrees in "applied science." Courses and research cover varied fields including neuroscience, optics, materials science and engineering, nondestructive testing, and nuclear magnetic resonance. University of Nebraska–Lincoln offers a Bachelor of Science in applied science, an online completion Bachelor of Science in applied science and a Master of Applied Science. Course work is centered on science, agriculture and natural resources with a wide range of options including ecology, food genetics, entrepreneurship, economics, policy, animal science and plant science. In New York City, the Bloomberg administration awarded the consortium of Cornell-Technion $100 million in City capital to construct the universities' proposed Applied Sciences campus on Roosevelt Island.

See also

 Basic research
 Exact sciences
 Hard and soft science
 Invention
 Secondary research

References

External links
 

 
Branches of science